{{Speciesbox
| image = 
| status = LC
| status_system = IUCN3.1
| status_ref = <ref name="iucn status 11 November 2021">{{cite iucn |authors=Scott, N. & Cacciali, P. |date=2019 |title='Tropidurus guarani |volume=2019|page=e.T49845554A49845560 |url=https://www.iucnredlist.org/species/49845554/49845560 |access-date=16 December 2021}}</ref> 
| genus = Tropidurus
| species = guarani
| authority = Álvarez, Cei, & Scolaro, 1994
}}Tropidurus guarani'' is a species of lizard of the Tropiduridae family. It is found in Paraguay and Brazil.

References

Tropidurus
Reptiles described in 1994
Reptiles of Paraguay
Reptiles of Brazil